The Friday Men were a Czech intellectual and political circle that met in the garden of Karel Čapek's Prague house on Friday afternoons from 1921 till Čapek's death in 1938. The group also sometimes met in Café Slavia.

A cartoon by Adolf Hoffmeister shows in the first row Ferdinand Peroutka, editor of the Prager Presse Arne Laurin, then in the second row: Karl Kraus, František Langer, Karel Čapek, theatre critic Josef Kodíček, and then in the third row Josef Čapek, Vladislav Vančura, Tomáš Masaryk, Edvard Beneš, Karel Poláček, and finally in the fourth row journalist František Kubka, Josef Kopta, Dr. L. Procházka, Vilem Mathesius, and historian . No women attended.

Čapek's wife Olga Scheinpflugová attempted to revive the meetings after World War II. Among post-war participants were Hugo Haas, Jaroslav Seifert, František Langer and Vlado Clementis.

References

Debating societies